Benedictia is a genus of freshwater snails with an operculum, aquatic gastropod molluscs or micromolluscs in the family Lithoglyphidae.

Benedictia is the type genus of the subfamily Benedictiinae.

Distribution 
The genus Benedictia is endemic to Lake Baikal.

Species
Species within the genus Benedictia include:
 Benedictia baicalensis (Gerstfeldt, 1859)
 Benedictia distinguenda Lindholm, 1924
 Benedictia distinguenda lamuana Sitnikova, 1987
 Benedictia fragilis W. Dybowski, 1875 - type species
 Benedictia kotyensis Matiokin, Dzuban & Sitnikova, 1988
 Benedictia limnaeoides (Schrenck, 1867)
 Benedictia limnaeoides ongurensis Kozhov, 1936
 Benedictia limnaeoides litoralis Kozhov, 1936
 Benedictia maxima (W. Dybowski, 1875)
 Benedictia maxima marisminus Sitnikova, 1987
 Benedictia nana Beckman & Starobogatov, 1975 
 Benedictia pulchella Sitnikova, 1987
 Benedictia pulchella sarmensis Sitnikova, 1987
 Benedictia pumyla (Lindholm, 1924)
 Benedictia shadini Beckman & Starobogatov, 1975

References

External links 

Lithoglyphidae
Endemic fauna of Russia
Fauna of Lake Baikal